The Italian war of 15361538 was a conflict between King Francis I of France and Charles V, Holy Roman Emperor and King of Spain. The objective was to achieve control over territories in Northern Italy, in particular the Duchy of Milan. The war saw French troops invading Northern Italy, and Spanish troops invading France. The Truce of Nice, signed on June 18, 1538, ended hostilities, leaving Turin in French hands but affecting no significant change in the map of Italy. Overall, Spain increased its control over Italy, signifying the end of Italian independence. The war strengthened animosity between the Spanish and French, and reinforced ties between France and the Ottoman Empire which had sided with Francis I against Charles V.

Causes

Long-term 
In 1500, Louis XII made an agreement with Ferdinand II on dividing the Kingdom of Naples, as Frederick IV was removed from the Neapolitan throne. This was known as the Treaty of Grenada. This decision was heavily criticized by influential figures such as Niccolò Machiavelli, whose opinion was embraced by many of Italy's citizens as well. When Charles V came into power in 1519, he gained more of a reputation in Italy, as he joined Spain together with the Holy Roman Empire.

Short-term 
The war began in 1536 between Charles V and Francis I of France commenced upon the death of Francesco II Sforza, the duke of Milan.  Sforza had no children and died of a long and painful illness in 1535. Because he had no heirs, Francesco's dynasty was brought to an end by Charles V, whose niece, Christina of Denmark, was Francesco's wife. There were no protests when Charles V took over the Duchy of Milan from either the people or other Italian states. This shift in power marked a new era for France, as Jean de la Foret was brought in as an ambassador to the Ottoman Empire, a territory eagerly courted for its wide range of goods to trade and powerful military. Foret and Francis I secured an alliance with the Ottoman Empire, giving France a strong army, ready to attack targets such as Marseille and Piedmont, areas close to the Italian province of Genoa.

Events 
When Charles's son Philip inherited the duchy, Francis invaded Italy. Philippe de Chabot, a French general, led his army into Piedmont in March 1536, and proceeded to capture Turin the following month, but he failed to seize Milan.  In response, Charles invaded Provence, a region of France, advancing to Aix-en-Provence, and took Aix in August 1536 but his movement was halted by the French Army blocking routes to Marseilles. Afterwards, Charles withdrew to Spain rather than attacking the heavily fortified Avignon. There is also a story that French troops deliberately left over-ripe fruit on the trees in an attempt to give Charles's troops dysentery.

While Charles V was busy fighting for territory in France, Francis I's armies received massive reinforcements in Piedmont in terms of generals, troops, and horses on a march headed for Genoa. France had secured an alliance with the Ottoman Empire in 1536 through the diplomatic efforts of Jean de La Forêt, France's ambassador to the Ottoman Empire. A Franco-Turkish fleet was stationed in Marseille by the end of 1536, threatening Genoa, by planning to attack simultaneously with the French troops marching on land towards the city.[2] Unfortunately for the French and Ottomans, when they arrived in Genoa in August 1536 the defenses of the city had been recently reinforced. Instead, the troops marched onto Piedmont, capturing many towns there. In 1537 Barbarossa raided the Italian coast and laid a siege at Corfu, although this provided only limited assistance to the French.

With Charles V unsuccessful in battle and squeezed between the French invasion and the Ottomans, Francis I and Charles V ultimately made peace with the Truce of Nice on 18 June 1538.

Effects
The Truce of Nice, signed on June 18, 1538, ended the war, leaving Turin in French hands but affecting no significant change in the map of Italy. The Truce of Nice was notable because Charles and Francis refused to sit in the same room together because of their intense mutual hatred. Pope Paul III was forced to carry out negotiations by going from room to room, trying to reach an agreement between the two leaders. Tension from this war led to Charles V turning to fight against the Ottomans, only to lose at the Battle of Preveza on September 28, 1538.

Overall, Spain gained significant control over Italy. This Italian War meant that the independence of several Italian states had ended and that most of the Italian peninsula would be ruled (or influenced) by foreign monarchs. The political fragmentation of Italy, and the lack of an unified response to pressures from both France and Spain, made it highly susceptible to European politics and foreign invasions. Future Italian wars emerged from this conflict, specifically the Italian War of 1542-1546. Moreover, different parts of the peninsula experienced severe degrees of devastation on the territory, cities, and infrastructure. On occasion, armies plundered cities and slaughtered across the countryside.

This war entrenched hostilities between the Spanish and French, as they would continue to vie for control over territory and influence in Europe. For example, even after the death of Francis I in 1547, Henry II, Francis’ successor, continued aggression against the Imperial/Spanish and Charles V. The war weakened both countries financially. The Italian War of 1536–38 strengthened the alliance between the Ottomans and the French, for it took the both of them working together to make Charles V desire peace, in order to avoid a two-front war.

Notes

References

1530s conflicts
Italian Wars
Wars involving France
Wars involving the Holy Roman Empire
Wars involving Spain
1530s in the Holy Roman Empire
1530s in Italy
1536 in Italy
1537 in Italy
1538 in Italy
16th-century military history of France
16th-century military history of Spain
Wars of succession involving the states and peoples of Europe